"When Boy Meets Girl" is a song co-written and recorded by Canadian country music artist Terri Clark. It was released in October 1995 as the second single from her album Terri Clark. The song reached #3 on the RPM Country Tracks chart in February 1996 and #3 on the Billboard Hot Country Singles & Tracks chart. It was written by Clark, Tom Shapiro and Chris Waters.

Content
The song is about the changes brought about in a young man's life "when boy meets girl."

Critical reception
Deborah Evans Price, of Billboard magazine reviewed the song favorably, saying that Clark's "gutsy twang and the sharp production prowess of Keith Stegall and Chris Waters makes this a solid follow-up and another potential smash for Clark."

Music video
The music video was directed by Michael Merriman and premiered in October 1995.

Chart performance
"When Boy Meets Girl" debuted at number 75 on the U.S. Billboard Hot Country Singles & Tracks for the week of October 28, 1995.

Year-end charts

References

1995 singles
Terri Clark songs
Songs written by Terri Clark
Songs written by Tom Shapiro
Songs written by Chris Waters
Song recordings produced by Keith Stegall
Mercury Records singles
1995 songs